Cando is a city in Towner County, North Dakota, United States. It is the county seat of Towner County. The population was 1,117 at the 2020 census. Cando was founded in 1884.

History
Cando was founded in 1884 as the seat of the newly formed Towner County. It was named from the pioneers' "can do" spirit. The Great Northern Railway was extended to Cando in 1888.  

Just west of Cando, Dunkers Colony was founded by settlers from Indiana in 1894. The settlement later changed its name to Zion, and all that is left today is a cemetery west of Cando.

Geography

Demographics

Education
Its school district is North Star Schools. It was in the Cando School District until 2008, when it merged with Bisbee-Egeland School District into North Star.

Notable people

 Dick Armey, U.S. Congressman; House Majority Leader
 Dave Osborn, running back for the Minnesota Vikings
 Fountain L. Thompson, U.S. Senator, lived in Cando

Climate
This climatic region is typified by large seasonal temperature differences, with warm to hot (and often humid) summers and cold (sometimes severely cold) winters.  According to the Köppen Climate Classification system, Cando has a humid continental climate, abbreviated "Dfb" on climate maps.

References

External links
 City of Cando official website
 Cando, North Dakota: a history of its people and events (1984) from the Digital Horizons website

Cities in North Dakota
Cities in Towner County, North Dakota
County seats in North Dakota
Populated places established in 1884
1884 establishments in Dakota Territory